The eighth and final season of Australian television drama series Wentworth, premiered on Fox Showcase on 28 July 2020. The twenty-episode final season has been divided into two parts; the first, titled Wentworth: Redemption, contains the first ten episodes (2020), while the second, titled Wentworth: The Final Sentence, includes the remaining ten episodes and commenced broadcast on 24 August 2021. The story picks up sometime following the siege at the end of the previous season where the prisoners and staff struggle to rebuild their lives as they struggle to cope in the aftermath. In season 8 Joan Ferguson returns, and it is explained how she escaped death after being buried alive by Will Jackson.

This season introduced four new main characters: Ann Reynolds (Jane Hall), Lou Kelly (Kate Box), Judy Bryant (Vivienne Awosoga), Reb Keane (Zoe Terakes), and special guest stars Marta Dusseldorp as Sheila Bausch and Tina Bursill as Eve Wilder.

Cast

Main

 Leah Purcell as Rita Connors
 Kate Jenkinson as Allie Novak
 Katrina Milosevic as Susan "Boomer" Jenkins
 Robbie J Magasiva as Governor Will Jackson
 Bernard Curry as Jake Stewart
 Rarriwuy Hick as Ruby Mitchell
 Susie Porter as Marie Winter
 Kate Box as Lou Kelly
 Jane Hall as Ann Reynolds
 Zoe Terakes as Reb Keane
 Vivienne Awosoga as Judy Bryant
 Kate Atkinson as Vera Bennett
 Pamela Rabe as Joan Ferguson

Special guest
 Marta Dusseldorp as Sheila Bausch
 Tina Bursill as Eve Wilder
 Gary Sweet as Dale Langdon

Recurring
 David de Lautour as Dr. Greg Miller
 Jacquie Brennan as Deputy Governor Linda Miles
 Peter O'Brien as Tony Cockburn
 Emily Havea as Mon Alson
 Louisa Mignone as Zaina Saad
 Alexandra Schepisi as Cynthia Rattray
 Dion Mills as Joe Hoxon
 Marco Chiappi as Liam Skinner
 Tom Wren as Dominic Slade
 Kevin Harrington as Officer Roberts
 Alex Andreas as Detective Kanellis
 Mereoni Vuki as Detective McKenner
 Cecilia Low as Officer Deng
 Nicholas Farnell as Detective Jones
 Patrick Harvey as Detective Morelli
 Cle Morgan as Carla Sturgess
 Lana Williams as Kath Maxwell
 Greg Fryer as Blair Mitchell

Episodes

Production

Season eight of Wentworth went into production in October 2019. It consists of twenty episodes
, titled "Redemption", and featured the first ten episodes in 2020, while the final episodes were broadcast in 2021.

Brian Walsh, Foxtel Executive Director of Television commented that "Wentworth has been the shining star of Foxtel’s extensive slate of Australian dramas and we are very proud to call “action” on the new season. We are indebted to the remarkable creative talent involved and to showcase the outstanding line-up of actors who bring to life this compelling series."

Kate Box joined the cast as Lou Kelly, a former top dog of Wentworth Correctional Facility who often uses a violent approach to get what she wants, along with Jane Hall as Ann Reynolds, a General Manager of extreme authority, taking control of the prison following the siege, and Zoe Terakes as transgender character Reb Keane, a meek and shy prisoner and love interest for Lou. It was later announced that actress Vivienne Awosoga would be joining the cast as Judy Bryant. The characters originally appeared in Prisoner in which Lou Kelly was played by Louise Siversen, Ann Reynolds by Gerda Nicolson, Reb Keane by Janet Andrewartha and Judy Bryant by Betty Bobbitt. In June 2020, it was announced that Marta Dusseldorp would join the cast as Sheila Bausch, a cult member accused of mass murder, theft and arson. It was announced in late 2020 that Tina Bursill had been cast as Eve Wilder and is set to appear in the final part of the eighth season in 2021. Bursill portrayed the original Sonia Stevens character in Prisoner, while the character she will be portraying in Wentworth was originally played by Lynda Stoner in Prisoner.

Reception

Ratings

Accolades

Equity Ensemble Awards
 Nominated: Most Outstanding Performance by an Ensemble in a Drama Series – Wentworth (Season 8, Part 1)
TV Tonight Awards
 Won: TV Tonight Award for Best Australian Drama Series – Wentworth (Season 8, Part 1)

International broadcast
The season premiered in Australia on Fox Showcase on 28 July 2020. and on August 5 on 5STAR in the UK. In New Zealand, the season is distributed on TVNZ's TVNZ 2 and TVNZ OnDemand streaming service.

In June 2021, it was announced that Season 8, Part 2 was intended to premiere in Germany on 21 July 2021 on Sky Atlantic where it would air double episodes each week; the announcement was made ahead of Foxtel's confirmed release date of 24 August, therefore prompting Sky Atlantic in Germany to reschedule their premiere date and begin broadcast sometime after it has aired in Australia.

The second part of the season premiered on the same day as Australia, 24 August 2021, on 5STAR in the UK.

Home media

References

External links
 

2020 Australian television seasons
2021 Australian television seasons
Wentworth (TV series)